German submarine U-922 was a Type VIIC U-boat of Nazi Germany's Kriegsmarine during World War II.

She was ordered on 6 June 1941, and was laid down on 15 December 1941 at Neptun Werft AG, Rostock, as yard number 509. She was launched on 1 June 1943 and commissioned under the command of Leutnant zur See Ulrich-Philipp Graf von und zu Arco-Zinneberg on 1 August 1943.

Design
German Type VIIC submarines were preceded by the shorter Type VIIB submarines. U-922 had a displacement of  when at the surface and  while submerged. She had two shafts and two  propellers.

U-922 was fitted with five  torpedo tubes (four fitted at the bow and one at the stern), fourteen torpedoes or 26 TMA mines, one  SK C/35 naval gun, (220 rounds), one  Flak M42 and two twin  C/30 anti-aircraft guns. The boat had a complement of between 44 — 52 men.

Service history
U-922 was scuttled at Kiel, on 3 May 1945, as part of Operation Regenbogen. Her wreck was raised and broken up in 1947.

References

6.  Number designation used in Broken Lizard movie “Beerfest” 2006

Bibliography

External links

German Type VIIC submarines
U-boats commissioned in 1943
World War II submarines of Germany
Ships built in Rostock
1943 ships
Operation Regenbogen (U-boat)
Maritime incidents in May 1945